Awa Sissoko (born March 6, 1994 in Paris) is a French basketball player who plays for club USO Mondeville of the League feminine de basket the top league of basketball for women in France.

References

French women's basketball players
1994 births
Basketball players from Paris
Living people